Aonghus Ó Dálaigh (fl. c. 1200) was an Irish poet.

Aonghus was a grandson of Cú Connacht Ua Dálaigh (died 1139) and said to be the common ancestor of all the O'Dalys extant. He is recorded as having six sons:

 1 - Cearbhall Fionn Ó Dálaigh - ancestor of Ó Dálaigh Fionn, poet to Ó Caoimh of Duhallow, County Cork
 2 - Donnchadh Mór Ó Dálaigh - ancestor to Ó Dálaigh of County Clare and County Galway
 3 - Cormac na Casbhairne Ó Dálaigh
 4 - Muireadhach Albanach - crusader poet of Lissadill, County Sligo
 5 - Gilla na Naemh Ó Dálaigh
 6 - Tadhg Ó Dálaigh - ancestor of Ó Dálaigh of Breifne and Connacht

No obit of Aonghus is known to exist in any of the Irish annals.

See also

 MacMhuirich bardic family

External links

13th-century Irish poets
Medieval Irish poets
People from County Westmeath
12th-century births
13th-century deaths
12th-century Irish writers
13th-century Irish writers
12th-century Irish poets
Irish male poets